Ulrich Peter Kowalczyk (born 28 March 1964) is a German football manager who manages Corsarios de Campeche.

Career

In 1994, Kowalczyk left Venezuela for Costa Rica after working in the tourist industry with the intention of becoming a manager.

In 2000, Kowalczyk was appointed manager of Costa Rican top flight side Carmelita after managing Santa Bárbara in the Costa Rican top flight. Since 2009 he manage Mexican fourth division club Corsarios de Campeche.

References

German expatriates in Venezuela
German expatriate sportspeople in Costa Rica
German expatriate sportspeople in Mexico
German expatriate football managers
German football managers
Expatriate football managers in Mexico
Expatriate football managers in Costa Rica
Living people
1964 births
A.D. Carmelita managers
Sportspeople from Bavaria